Polmadie Traction and Rolling Stock Maintenance Depot (T&RSMD), also known as Polmadie Depot, Polmadie Traction Depot and Polmadie Carriage Maintenance Depot (Glasgow) is a railway maintenance depot on the West Coast Main Line in the Polmadie district of Glasgow, Scotland. The depot is run by Alstom, who maintain Avanti West Coast's fleet of Class 390 Pendolinos built by Alstom, and Class 221 Super Voyagers, originally built by Bombardier

The depot is also used for daytime storage, maintenance and cleaning of Caledonian Sleeper stock.

The depot was originally built in 1879 by the Caledonian Railway.

References

Rail transport in Scotland
Transport in Glasgow
1879 establishments in Scotland
Railway depots in Scotland